Achillea atrata, commonly called black yarrow or dark stemmed sneezewort, is European species of herbaceous perennial flowering plant native to the Alpine regions of Switzerland, France, Italy, Germany, Austria, and Slovenia.

References

External links
Canopé académie de Besançon, Achillea atrata in French with color photos
Botanik im Bild, Flora von Österreich, Schwarzrand-Schafgarbe,  Schwarze Schafgarbe in German with color photos
Infoflora, Pro Natura, la Société Botanique Suisse (SBS) et l'Académie Suisse des Sciences Naturelles Achillea atrata L. in French with color photos

atrata
Flora of the Alps
Plants described in 1753
Taxa named by Carl Linnaeus